The following is a list of Canada women's national rugby union team international matches.

Overall 
Canada's overall international match record against all nations, updated to 18 October 2022, is as follows:

Full internationals

1980s 
Canada and the United States played the first international test match outside of Europe.

1990s

2000s

2010s

2020s

Other matches

References 

Canada women's national rugby union team
Women's rugby union in Canada